Daiches is a Scottish surname. Notable people with the surname include:

 David Daiches (1912–2005), Scottish literary historian and literary critic
 Jenni Daiches (born 1941), Scottish literary historian
 Lionel Daiches (1911–1999), Scottish politician

Surnames of Scottish origin